Jiyaad Magrey (born 29 October 1999) is an Indian cricketer. He made his first-class debut on 4 February 2020, for Jammu & Kashmir in the 2019–20 Ranji Trophy. He made his Twenty20 debut on 18 January 2021, for Jammu & Kashmir in the 2020–21 Syed Mushtaq Ali Trophy.

References

External links
 

1999 births
Living people
Indian cricketers
Jammu and Kashmir cricketers
Place of birth missing (living people)